ICME may refer to:

 Integrated computational materials engineering, a product design technique
 Institute of Cast Metals Engineers, a British professional engineering institution
 International Congress on Mathematical Education, held every four years under the auspices of the International Commission on Mathematical Instruction
 Interplanetary coronal mass ejection, disturbance from Sun's corona that launches electromagnetic waves and accelerating particles
 International Conference on Materials Engineering
 İçme, Elâzığ